Beverley Road railway station was a station on the Hull and Barnsley Railway, and served the Beverley Road area of Hull, East Riding of Yorkshire, England.

It opened on 27 July 1885 and closed to passengers on 14 July 1924 after the London and North Eastern Railway had built the Spring Bank chord to Hull Paragon.

References

Disused railway stations in Kingston upon Hull
Railway stations in Great Britain opened in 1885
Railway stations in Great Britain closed in 1924
Former Hull and Barnsley Railway stations